Tubba may refer to:

 Tubba, a character in the video game Drawn to Life
 Tubba', an honorific title ascribed to the rulers of Saba and Himyar, including in the Quran

See also
 Tuba (disambiguation)